Devil Diver (1939–1961) was an American Thoroughbred racehorse. He was twice voted American Champion Older Male Horse.

Background
Devil Diver was foaled at Mrs. Payne Whitney's Greentree Stable in Lexington, Kentucky. A bay colt by Sir Germans, he was out of Dabchick, and a member of the same foal crop as Shut Out. Devil Diver was trained by the Hall of Fame conditioner John M. Gaver, Sr., who also trained Shut Out.

Racing career
Both Shut Out and Devil Diver were pointed towards the 1942 Kentucky Derby, especially as Devil Diver had opened his three-year-old season winning the Phoenix Handicap and in the process beating Whirlaway who only the year before had won the United States Triple Crown of Thoroughbred Racing.

The Hall of Fame jockey Eddie Arcaro believed Devil Diver to be the superior horse (he hadn't been out of the money in 13 starts), and so chose to ride him in the Derby only to come in sixth as Shut Out won the prestigious race under jockey Wayne Wright by two lengths over Alsab. At three, of the two best Whitney colts, Shut Out prevailed.  But at four, Devil Diver came into his own, living up to the promise of his two-and-three-year-old seasons.  At the end of 1943 he was named Champion Handicap Horse by the Daily Racing Form although the rival Turf & Sports Digest award went to Market Wise. In 1944 he was named Champion Handicap Horse in both major polls. In 1944, he came close to American Horse of the Year but lost the Pimlico Special to the filly Twilight Tear in a three horse race that included the very good Megogo.

Devil Diver holds a record that has so far never been broken. He won the Metropolitan Handicap in three consecutive years: 1943, 1944, and 1945.  One of those wins, 1944, was accomplished under an unbroken record weight of 134 pounds. In his Suburban Handicap win, he gave the champion Stymie thirteen pounds. In 1944, the five-year-old Devil Diver won seven stakes race and in each he carried more than 130 pounds. Better with age, at five he competed at a variety of distances under a variety of weights, all heavy. In his last year, he was voted handicap horse of the season in both polls.

Stud record
Devil Diver stood at stud at Greentree Farm.  He was not outstanding, but over the years sired 18 stakes winners including Beau Diable, Call Over, Lotowhite, and the good broodmare Anchors Aweigh.

Devil Diver died in 1961.

References

 Devil Diver in the Hall of Fame

1939 racehorse births
1961 racehorse deaths
Racehorses bred in Kentucky
Racehorses bred in the United States
United States Thoroughbred Racing Hall of Fame inductees
Whitney racehorses
Thoroughbred family 13-c